Michael Louis Bratz (born October 17, 1955) is a retired American basketball player and former the assistant general manager for the Sacramento Kings. He played professionally in the NBA for the Phoenix Suns, Cleveland Cavaliers, San Antonio Spurs, Chicago Bulls, Golden State Warriors, and Sacramento Kings.

Early life and career
Bratz was born in Lompoc, California and graduated from Lompoc High School. He played college basketball at Allan Hancock College and Stanford University.

After being selected by the Phoenix Suns in the 1977 NBA Draft, and made his NBA debut on October 18, 1977 with the Suns. Bratz played nine seasons in the NBA. He is famous for being the last Bulls player to wear number 23 prior to Michael Jordan. Referencing his time wearing number 23 while with the Bulls, Bratz appeared in a commercial for the Chicago area sports bar Candlelite in 2008. The commercial teased that he was Michael Jordan before being revealed on camera, to which he said "What, you're expecting someone else?"

NBA career statistics

Regular season 

|-
| style="text-align:left;"| 
| style="text-align:left;"|Phoenix
| 80 || – || 11.7 || .403 || – || .824 || 1.4 || 1.5 || 0.5 || 0.1 || 4.7
|-
| style="text-align:left;"| 
| style="text-align:left;"|Phoenix
| 77 || – || 16.8 || .454 || – || .818 || 1.8 || 2.3 || 0.8 || 0.1 || 8.1
|-
| style="text-align:left;"| 
| style="text-align:left;"|Phoenix
| 82 || – || 19.4 || .392 || .244 || .870 || 2.0 || 2.7 || 1.1 || 0.1 || 8.5
|-
| style="text-align:left;"| 
| style="text-align:left;"|Cleveland
| 80 || – || 32.4 || .390 || .337 || .811 || 2.5 || 5.7 || 1.7 || 0.2 || 10.0
|-
| style="text-align:left;"| 
| style="text-align:left;"|San Antonio
| 81 || 3 || 20.0 || .407 || .333 || .783 || 2.0 || 5.4 || 0.8 || 0.1 || 7.7
|-
| style="text-align:left;"| 
| style="text-align:left;"|Chicago
| 15 || 0 || 9.3 || .333 || .125 || .769 || 1.3 || 1.5 || 0.5 || 0.0 || 2.6
|-
| style="text-align:left;"| 
| style="text-align:left;"|Golden State
| 82 || 0 || 17.4 || .409 || .294 || .876 || 1.7 || 3.1 || 1.0 || 0.1 || 6.8
|-
| style="text-align:left;"| 
| style="text-align:left;"|Golden State
| 56 || 6 || 13.3 || .424 || .231 || .841 || 1.0 || 2.2 || 0.8 || 0.1 || 5.1
|-
| style="text-align:left;"| 
| style="text-align:left;"|Sacramento
| 33 || 0 || 8.2 || .371 || .286 || .778 || 0.7 || 1.2 || 0.4 || 0.0 || 2.1
|- class="sortbottom"
| style="text-align:center;" colspan="2"| Career
|586 || 9 || 18.1 || .407 || .305 || .830 || 1.8 || 3.2 || 0.9 || 0.1 || 7.0

Playoffs 

|-
|style="text-align:left;"|1978
|style="text-align:left;”|Phoenix
|2||–||4.5||.200||–||–||0.0||0.5||0.0||0.0||1.0
|-
|style="text-align:left;"|1979
|style="text-align:left;”|Phoenix
|15||–||19.5||.496||–||.763||1.4||2.0||1.0||0.2||10.6
|-
|style="text-align:left;"|1980
|style="text-align:left;”|Phoenix
|8||–||21.1||.512||.391||.900||2.5||2.0||1.1||0.0||13.0
|-
|style="text-align:left;"|1982
|style="text-align:left;”|San Antonio
|9||–||20.0||.288||.278||.800||1.6||5.3||1.0||0.0||4.8
|-
|style="text-align:left;"|1986
|style="text-align:left;”|Sacramento
|3||0||5.0||.500||–||1.000||1.3||0.3||0.0||0.0||2.3
|- class="sortbottom"
| style="text-align:center;" colspan="2"| Career
| 37 || 0 || 18.0 || .454 || .341 || .788 || 1.6 || 2.6 || 0.9 || 0.1 || 8.5

References

External links

databaseBasketball.com
Legends of Basketball
Sports Illustrated: Bulls by the Numbers

1955 births
Living people
Allan Hancock Bulldogs men's basketball players
American men's basketball players
Basketball players from California
Chicago Bulls players
Cleveland Cavaliers players
Dallas Mavericks expansion draft picks
Golden State Warriors players
People from Lompoc, California
Phoenix Suns draft picks
Phoenix Suns players
Point guards
Sacramento Kings players
San Antonio Spurs players
Sportspeople from Santa Barbara County, California
Stanford Cardinal men's basketball players